Anne Line Hogstad is a Norwegian kickboxer and Muay Thai fighter competing in the Atomweight and Strawweight divisions. 

She is ranked #4 in the ONE Atomweight kickboxing division and #2 in the ONE Atomweight Muay Thai division. WBC Muaythai ranks her as the #4 Super Flyweight in the world, as of April 2020.

She is a former two-time ISKA Muay Thai World Champion, ISKA Norwegian and Scandinavian Muay Thai champion, two-time Norwegian IFMA champion and two-time K-1 Nordic champion.

Kickboxing career
Fighting at Oslo Fight Night, Hogstad faced Laura Prouse. She won the fight by a unanimous decision. During Battle of Lund 6 she achieved another victory, a decision win over Emilia Olsson. Following this win, she would lose to Therese Gunnarsson by way of TKO.

Hogstad would suffer a unanimous decision loss during Get in the Ring 18, dropping a decision to Meryem Uslu. This would be followed by a failed bid to capture the ISKA World title, as Hogstad lost a unanimous decision to Cynthia Gonzalez. She extended her losing streak to three fights, after losing a unanimous decision to Georgina van der Linden during Enfusion 71. She would bounce back with a win over Anna Höglund.

During La Nuit de l’Impact 5 Hogstad fought Delphine Guénon for the ISKA European K-1 title. Guénon won the title through a unanimous decision.

During the ONE Championship: Fire and Fury event, Hogstad faced the former WBC Muaythai champion Alma Juniku. The three round fight started slowly, with both fighters picking up the pace in the second round, while Juniku received a yellow card for repeated fouls. This also meant Juniku would forfeit 10% of her purse to Hogstad, who would eventually win a majority decision.

Hogstad faced Janet Todd at ONE on TNT 2 on April 14, 2021. She lost via a body kick that dropped Hogstad in the third round.

Championships and accomplishments
International Sport Karate Association
ISKA World Muay Thai Champion (Two times)
ISKA Scandinavian Muay Thai Champion
ISKA Norwegian Muay Thai Champion
International Federation of Muaythai Associations
IFMA Norwegian Muay Thai Champion (Two times)
K-1
K-1 Nordic Champion (Two times)

Fight record

|-  style="background:#fbb;"
| 2021-04-14|| Loss ||align=left| Janet Todd|| ONE on TNT 2 || Kallang, Singapore || TKO (Body kick) || 3 || 1:36  
|-
|-  style="background:#cfc;"
| 2020-01-31|| Win ||align=left| Alma Juniku || ONE Championship: Fire and Fury || Manila, Philippines || Decision (Majority) || 3 || 3:00
|-  style="background:#fbb;"
| 2019-08-24|| Loss ||align=left| Rhona Walker || Science of 8 || Doncaster, England  || Decision (Unanimous) || 5 || 3:00 
|-
! style=background:white colspan=9 |
|-  style="background:#fbb;"
| 2019-06-15|| Loss ||align=left| Delphine Guénon || La Nuit de l’Impact V || Saintes, France || Decision (Unanimous) || 5 || 3:00 
|-
! style=background:white colspan=9 |
|-  style="background:#cfc;"
| 2019-05-25|| Win ||align=left| Anna Höglund || Southside Battle 28 || Haninge, Sweden || Decision (Unanimous) || 3 || 3:00
|-  style="background:#fbb;"
| 2018-09-29|| Loss ||align=left| Georgina van der Linden || Enfusion 71 || Hamburg, Germany || Decision (Unanimous) || 3 || 3:00
|-  style="background:#fbb;"
| 2018-07-07|| Loss ||align=left| Yang Yang || Glory of Heroes 32 || Huizhou, Guangdong, China || Decision (Unanimous) || 3 || 3:00
|-  style="background:#fbb;"
| 2018-03-23|| Loss ||align=left| Cynthia Gonzalez || Kaeng Fight Night || Vannes, France || Decision (Unanimous) || 5 || 3:00 
|-
! style=background:white colspan=9 |
|-  style="background:#fbb;"
| 2018-03-11|| Loss ||align=left| Meryem Uslu || Get in the Ring 18 || Hamburg, Germany || Decision (Unanimous) || 3 || 3:00
|-  style="background:#fbb;"
| 2016-11-12|| Loss ||align=left| Josefine Lindgren Knutsson || Battle of Lund 8 || Lund, Sweden || Decision (Unanimous) || 5 || 3:00 
|-
! style=background:white colspan=9 |
|-  style="background:#fbb;"
| 2015-7-4|| Loss ||align=left| Amy Pirnie || Stand And Bang || Woking, United Kingdom || Decision (Unanimous) || 3 || 3:00
|-  style="background:#fbb;"
| 2014-11-22|| Loss ||align=left| Therese Gunnarsson  || Westcoast Kickboxing || Gothenburg, Sweden || TKO ||  || 
|-
|-  style="background:#cfc;"
| 2014-9-29|| Win ||align=left| Emilia Olsson  || Battle of Lund 6 || Woking, United Kingdom || Decision (Unanimous) || 5 || 2:00 
|-
|-  style="background:#fbb;"
| 2015-02-28|| Loss ||align=left| Nicola Kaye || ? || England || Decision (Unanimous) || 5 || 3:00 
|-
! style=background:white colspan=9 |
|-  style="background:#cfc;"
| 2014-10-5|| Win ||align=left| Laura Prouse  || Oslo Fight Night || Oslo, Norway || Decision (Unanimous) || 3 || 3:00 
|-
|-  style="background:#fbb;"
| 2013-8-17|| Loss ||align=left| Grace Spicer  || Stand and Bang || Woking, United Kingdom || Decision (Unanimous) || 5 || 2:00 
|-
|-
| colspan=9 | Legend:    

|-  style="background:#fbb;"
| 2015-11-14 || Loss ||align=left| Sofia Olofsson || Nordic Muay Thai Championships   || Oslo, Norway || Decision (Unanimous) || 3 || 2:00 
|-
|-  style="background:#cfc;"
| 2015-11-14 || Win ||align=left| Elina Immonen  || Nordic Muay Thai Championships   || Oslo, Norway || Decision (Unanimous) || 3 || 2:00 
|-
|-  style="background:#fbb;"
| 2014|| Loss ||align=left| Laura Prouse || Rising Muay Thai Stars  || Oslo, Norway || Decision (Unanimous) || 3 || 2:00 
|-
|-
| colspan=9 | Legend:

See also
 List of female kickboxers

References 

Norwegian kickboxers
1988 births

Living people
ONE Championship kickboxers
Sportspeople from Oslo